Gordon Jones (born 21 November 1947), originally from Merseyside, is a Scottish folk musician playing guitar, bohdran, bouzuki and autoharp  and founding member of Silly Wizard. Performed with Silly Wizard during their entire 17 years together as well as composing and producing both music and albums for Silly Wizard, two of which received MRA awards.

With Silly Wizard
Having moved to Edinburgh in his youth to study art, he became involved in the Scottish music scene meeting fellow musicians Bob Thomas and Johnny Cunningham founding Silly Wizard (after many other names), as well as spending some time prior to 1972 running and performing in the Triangle Folk Club in Edinburgh with Silly Wizard band mates Bob Thomas and Johnny Cunningham.

Gordon Jones has performed on the band's eight studio albums and the four live albums, touring with Silly Wizard until 1988.

Discography
1976 Silly Wizard
1978 Caledonia's Hardy Sons
1979 So Many Partings
1980 Take the High Road (Single)
1981 Wild and Beautiful
1983 Kiss the Tears Away
1985 Live In America
1985 Golden Golden
1985 The Best Of Silly Wizard
1987 A Glint of Silver
1988 Live Wizardry
2012 Live Again

After Silly Wizard
Gordon Jones is also founder and co-owner of Harbourtown Records with Bob Thomas, another member of Silly Wizard.  A minor folk record label with around 50 titles and several prestigious awards (from MRS and Nairn) recognising the quality of the production, most notably for the excellent Frivolous Love. More recently (2010) he has sat on the governing body for the English Folk Dance and Song Society (EFDSS) National Council and performs with The Old Friends Band, who specialise in Cumbrian tunes and dances.

References

External links
  Gordon Jones
 Silly Wizard review by Alistair Clark
 Harbourtown Records home pages

1947 births
Living people
Scottish folk musicians
Scottish multi-instrumentalists
Scottish record producers
Musicians from Merseyside
Silly Wizard members